Jamestown was a constituency represented in the Irish House of Commons until 1800. It took its name from Jamestown, County Leitrim.

History
In the Patriot Parliament of 1689 summoned by James II, Jamestown was represented with two members.

Jamestown was a small village containing approximately 48 houses.

Members of Parliament, 1622–1801
1634–1635 Charles Coote jnr and Sir William Anderson
1639–1649 Sir John Giffard and Sir Francis Hamilton
1661–1666 Sir Robert Meredith and Sir William Dixon

1689–1801

Notes

References

Bibliography

Constituencies of the Parliament of Ireland (pre-1801)
Historic constituencies in County Leitrim
1622 establishments in Ireland
1800 disestablishments in Ireland
Constituencies established in 1622
Constituencies disestablished in 1800